The Men's 200 metre individual medley competition of the swimming events at the  2015 World Aquatics Championships was held on 5 August with the heats and the semifinals and 6 August with the final.

Records
Prior to the competition, the existing world and championship records were as follows.

Results

Heats
The heats were held at 10:30.

Semifinals
The semifinals were held at 18:45.

Semifinal 1

Semifinal 2

Swim-off
The swim-off was held at 19:42.

Final
The final was held at 17:42.

References

Men's 200 metre individual medley